Ryu Hyun-woo is a former North Korea’s ambassador to Kuwait. He defected to South Korea in September 2019. Ryu’s wife is the daughter of Jon Il-chun, who oversaw operations of North Korea’s Room 39 for over a decade. Ryu was posted to Syria from 2010 to 2013.

See also 
 Thae Yong-ho − former North Korea's deputy ambassador to the United Kingdom, member of the National Assembly in South Korea

References 

Living people
North Korean defectors
North Korean diplomats
Year of birth missing (living people)